Sherf is a surname. Notable people with the surname include:

John Sherf (1913–1991), American hockey player
Ze'ev Sherf (1904–1984), Israeli politician
Zvi Sherf (born 1951), Israeli basketball player and coach

See also
Scherf
Scherf (surname)
Scherff